Charlotte Cunningham-Rundles, an American physician, is the David S. Gottesman Professor of Immunology at the Mount Sinai School of Medicine in New York City. a specialist in primary immunodeficiency disorders.  She is also director of  the Immunodeficiency Clinic at Mount Sinai Hospital, and the program director of their Allergy Immunology Fellowship training program.

Education
Cunningham-Rundles grew up in North Carolina, the daughter of Dr. Wayne Rundles and Professor Mary Alice Cunningham-Rundles.  She graduated from Duke University in 1965 with a bachelor's degree in zoology. She received a M.D, in 1969 from  the Columbia University College of Physicians and Surgeons, completed in 1972 her internship and residency at Bellevue Hospitall in New York City, and  received a Ph.D. in immunology in 1974 from New York University School of Medicine,

Career
She  specializes in allergy and immunology.  She worked as the director of the immunodeficiency clinic at Sloan-Kettering Memorial Hospital  until she moved to Mount Sinai Hospital in 1986. She  is currently the David S. Gottesman Professor of Immunology at the Mount Sinai School of Medicine in New York. She is also a professor of medicine and pediatrics at Mount Sinai School of Medicine and a member of the Immunology institute. She is the director of the Immunodeficiency Clinic at Mount Sinai, where she treats patients with primary immunodeficiency disorders. She also does important drug research related to immunodeficiency disorders. And, she is the director of the Allergy Immunology Fellowship training program. According to her Mt Sinai hospital profile,"Rundles is an expert in the more than 150 Primary Immune Deficiency diseases, conditions that result from genetic defects of the immune system."

Memberships, societies, and committees 
She is a fellow of 
the  American Federation for Clinical Research, 
the American College of Physicians, 
the American Association of Asthma, Allergy and Immunology, where she is chair of the research committee.

She is a member of 
  American Board of Internal Medicine
  American Association of Immunologists
  Clinical Immunology Society, (secretary treasurer, 1994–1999, elected councilor, 1999, publications chair; president, 2003–2004)
  European Society for Immune Deficiency 
  The Mucosal Immune Society
  The Harvey Society
  The Henry Kunkel Society

References 

Year of birth missing (living people)
Living people
American immunologists
Columbia University Vagelos College of Physicians and Surgeons alumni
Duke University alumni